Colin William West (born 19 September 1967) is an English former footballer who played as a winger.

Career
Born in Middlesbrough, he began as an apprentice at Chelsea, scoring the winning goal against local rivals Arsenal on his first-team debut in March 1987 in the First Division campaign, aged 19. He had spent most of that season on loan at Scottish second-tier club Partick Thistle. In 1987–88 he remained at Chelsea but did not become a regular in the side, and was loaned to Third Division Swansea City during the next.

In 1990, West left Chelsea and signed for Dundee, helping them to win the Scottish Challenge Cup in 1990 and achieve promotion to the Scottish Premier Division in 1991–92 alongside former Chelsea colleague Billy Dodds, although they were relegated the next year. West then moved on, returning to his native North East England to play for Hartlepool United, where he was a regular but experienced another relegation, this time from the 'new' Second Division. He then dropped down to the Northern Premier League with local side Bishop Auckland.

Honours
Dundee
Scottish Challenge Cup:1990–91
Scottish First Division: 1991–92

References

1967 births
English footballers
Footballers from Middlesbrough
Association football wingers
Chelsea F.C. players
Partick Thistle F.C. players
Swansea City A.F.C. players
Dundee F.C. players
Hartlepool United F.C. players
Bishop Auckland F.C. players
Scottish Football League players
English Football League players
Northern Premier League players
Living people